The Marie Schock House is a Shingle Style house at 5749 West Race Avenue in Chicago, Illinois, United States.  The house was built in 1888 by Fredrick R. Schock for his mother Marie Schock. It was designated a Chicago Landmark on January 20, 1999.

References

Houses completed in 1888
Houses in Chicago
Chicago Landmarks
Shingle Style houses
1888 establishments in Illinois
Shingle Style architecture in Illinois